Bob Odell is a Republican former member of the New Hampshire Senate, representing the 8th District from 2002 through 2014. He was a member of the New Hampshire House of Representatives from 2000 until 2002. He resides in Lempster, New Hampshire.

External links
Follow the Money - Bob Odell
2006 20042002 2000 campaign contributions

1943 births
Living people
Republican Party members of the New Hampshire House of Representatives
Republican Party New Hampshire state senators
People from Nashua, New Hampshire
People from Lempster, New Hampshire